Bergantino is a comune (municipality) in the Province of Rovigo in the Italian region Veneto, located about  southwest of Venice and about  west of Rovigo. 
 
Bergantino borders the following municipalities: Borgofranco sul Po, Carbonara di Po, Castelnovo Bariano, Cerea, Legnago, Melara.

Composer Stefano Gobatti was born in Bergantino.

References

Cities and towns in Veneto